Counting the Hours is the second full-length studio album by alternative metal band Digital Summer. It was released on May 11, 2010, and features the singles "Just Run" and "Playing the Saint."

Track listing

Miscellaneous information 

 The first single "Just Run" was featured in active rotation on 98KUPD Phoenix, AZ [1], in addition to receiving airplay on KATT, KDJE, KDOT, KXXR, KBAZ, and Octane (Sirius XM).
 "Just Run" was also featured on HardDriveXL with Lou Brutus.
 "Just Run" and "Hostage" charted on Pulse Music Board's Active Rock chart at #98 and #101 respectively.
 "The Thrill" is being featured on ESPN's Slammed/Stomped program, which is a highlight show of the Winter X Games.
 The track "Playing the Saint" features guest vocals from Morgan Rose of Sevendust.
 Morgan Rose also appears as a guest drummer on the tracks "Anybody Out There" and "Use Me."
 The songs "Rescue Me" and "Use Me" are re-recorded versions from the Hollow EP.

Personnel 
 Kyle Winterstein - vocals, guitar, producer
 Ian Winterstein - guitar
 Johnmark Cenfield - guitar
 Anthony Hernandez- bass
 Ben Anderson - drums, assistant engineer
 Larry Elyea, Mind's Eye Digital - engineer
 Mike Bozzi at Bernie Grundman - mastering
 Morgan Rose of Sevendust - guest drums and vocals

References 

http://www.harddriveradio.com/

2010 albums
Digital Summer albums